Parliamentary elections were held in Afghanistan on 18 September 2010 to elect members of the House of the People (Wolesi Jirga). The Afghan Independent Election Commission - established in accordance with the article 156 of the Constitution of Afghanistan for the purpose of organizing and supervising all elections in the country - postponed the poll from its original date of 22 May to September 18.

The results were delayed on several occasions, but were finalized on October 31. The Taliban issued a direct threat to all those involved in the House of the People elections.

Campaign
The campaign period kicked off on June 23 and ran until September 16. On June 23, 2010, the full list of candidates was announced; 2,577 candidates filed to run, 405 of them women.

On July 7, 2010, the Electoral Complaint Commission announced that it had disqualified 36 candidates because of ties to illegal private militias. However, according to critics "the net caught a few small fish while the sharks swam around it". Sima Samar, who heads the Afghan Independent Human Rights Commission, said she was concerned that there were alleged war criminals on the candidate lists.

Security
"We urge people not to participate in the election. Everything and everyone affiliated with the election is our target -- candidates, security forces, campaigners, election workers, voters are all our targets," said Taliban spokesman Zabiullah Mujahid.

Three candidates were killed during the campaign period while there were several attempts on the lives of others, some of which have resulted in the deaths of campaign workers.

In a tally kept by the Free Election Foundation of Afghanistan, at least eleven campaign workers were killed.

Polling centres
On August 18, Afghanistan's Independent Election Commission announced it would open 5,897 polling centers for the 2010 Wolesi Jirga elections.  This was 938 fewer than the original plan to have 6,835 centers opened.

The decision on whether to open or close polling centers was a matter of debate but the IEC said decisions on the polling centers were made in conjunction with the country's security agencies and on September 5 said it was too late to open more. This view was supported by the United Nations and Democracy International.

On September 8, the IEC said a further 81 polling centers would remain shut in eastern Nangarhar province. This brought to 1,019 centers closed, which is almost 15 per cent of the preliminary list of 6835.

Voting system
The voting system used for House of the People elections is single non-transferable vote. The system allows for candidates with as little as less than one percent of the first-choice vote to be elected, something that happened with a number of candidates in the 2005 election. There have been calls to review the use of SNTV as it impedes the development of political parties and prevents fair and accurate representation of Afghanistan's diverse population.

Candidates
There were 2,584 candidates on the ballots for the 2010 Wolesi Jirga elections, across 34 provinces and a country-wide electorate for the nomadic Kuchi tribe.

Some 406 candidates were women, who are allocated at least 68 seats.

Notable incumbent candidates include: Ramazan Bashar Dost, who came third in the 2009 Afghan Presidential election; Younus Qanooni, runner-up to President Hamid Karzai  in the 2004 presidential election and the inaugural Speaker of the Wolesi Jirga; Shukria Barakzai, a vocal supporter of women's rights; and Mullah Abdul Salaam Rocketi, a former jihadist who earned his name from his skill in shooting rocket-propelled grenades during the Soviet occupation. All three of them stood for one of the 33 seats assigned to Kabul province. Fatima Aziz, an Afghan physician who was elected in 2005, was also re-elected.

Other candidates for Kabul included: comedian Zamir Kabuli, who is famous for ridiculing politicians and Farida Tarana, a 29-year-old former female contestant on Afghan Star, the local equivalent of American Idol.

Controversy
Reflecting on the disputed previous presidential election, in December 2009 representatives of donor states expressed worries and even suggested that voting should be postponed. Since the violence and the accusations of fraud that accompanied the 2009 election, another round of voting was expected to do more harm than good. The planned election might lead to a new campaign of violence by the Taliban to intimidate voters. The United Nations, the US and election observation missions, including one representing the European Union, had asked the Afghan government to refrain from further elections until it had written a new election law and created a list of registered voters.

United States congressmen visiting Kabul that month also urged President Karzai to delay until electoral reforms were in place. Otherwise, Afghanistan could risk American financial support. Karzai insisted that the elections had to be held in May,  despite concerns about their credibility.

On January 24, the election authorities in Afghanistan decided to postpone the elections until September 18, due to "security concerns, logistical problems, and insufficient funds". Using a loophole in the Constitution, the Karzai administration unilaterally rewrote the election law, and Karzai put it into effect by a decree on February 13, 2010. Under this new version, the five members of the Electoral Complaints Commission (ECC), would be chosen by the president after consultation with the parliamentary leadership. Previously, three of the seats were held by foreigners appointed by the United Nations and the other two members were Afghans. On March 31, 2010, the Lower House of the Afghan parliament rejected this change.

In a speech at the U.S. Institute of Peace (USIP) on May 17, 2010, former Foreign Minister Abdullah Abdullah warned that another rigged election would be catastrophic, even more than the discredited presidential election in August 2009 from which he dropped out.

On August 13, 2010, Staffan de Mistura, UN Secretary-General Ban Ki-moon's special representative for Afghanistan, called upon the Afghan security forces to show heightened vigilance, referring to widespread intimidation of female candidates, the killing of three candidates and other violence directed against candidates. The Free and Fair Election Foundation of Afghanistan (FEFA) stated that observers were based in all 34 provinces of Afghanistan to observe the campaigns at the provincial level, and volunteer observers in many districts as well.

Starting June 2010, FEFA published monitoring reports into the election campaign, in which it cataloged examples of violence against candidates or misuse of government resources. FEFA called on the Afghan government and Afghan and international security forces to take action against individuals perpetrating electoral violations and act decisively to protect voters and candidates and voters ahead of the parliamentary elections. In the report about the launch of the 2010 election campaigns, the FEFA detailed illegal actions of candidates, increasing attacks against candidates and campaign workers, and widespread intimidation of women. Warlords, the Taliban and rival candidates were blamed for the intimidation and already at least eight people had been assassinated in relation to the upcoming elections, including three candidates. According to some candidates the security situation was worse than with the 2009 elections, despite the arrival of the reinforcement of 30,000 American troops. Nader Nadery, Commissioner at the Afghanistan Independent Human Rights Commission (AIHRC) and director of FEFA, said that there was more intimidation, more attacks on female candidates and other candidates. "Areas in the south are becoming more and more insecure and areas in the north are becoming more and more intimidating for the weaker candidates." According to Mirwais Yasini, former deputy speaker of the Lower House and a candidate in Nangahar Province, in several districts it was impossible to campaign.

There were also reports of thousands of fake voter registration cards in circulation that threatened the credibility of elections.

Following the 2010 Qur'an-burning controversy, the UN's top diplomat in the country said the ensuing protests could force the delay of parliamentary elections.

Fraud prevention
The Independent Election Commission endeavored to prevent the massive fraud that marred 2009's presidential elections, in which one million ballots for President Hamid Karzai were ruled invalid.

The IEC sacked 6,000 election workers and tightened the security measures surrounding ballot boxes by introducing a computerized tracking system.

However, it was expected that fraud would still occur and would be hard to spot, according to election observers Democracy International.

Conduct
On election day, at least fourteen people were killed amid UN and US warnings that security and fraud were major concerns at the election. The Taliban also fired rockets in several cities including Kabul and set off bombs at a polling station and by the governor of Kandahar's convoy.

A Taliban website said that upwards of a hundred attacks had been carried out, though these claims were not confirmed; election authorities, however, said that the elections as a whole had been safe. The organization that monitored the elections, the Free and Fair Elections Foundation, said that "[t]hough there were numerous attacks, none were severe enough to disrupt voting on a wide scale."

Fraud was also a concern, as some people were discovered trying to cast over a thousand illegitimate votes on behalf of candidates. Some officials were accused of taking bribes; and permanent ink was used to mark the fingers of those who had voted so as to identify and prevent multiple votes.

The total turnout of voters was estimated to be almost 3.6 million out of a total of more than 10 million eligible voters. The United Nations said that if five million people voted, the vote could be considered a success, given the difficulties of holding an election during a war. The head of Afghanistan's Independent Election Commission said that he would consider the election a success if more than three million people voted, a tally that came to pass. Out of a planned 5,816 open voting locations, authorities said that 92% had opened as scheduled, while the remainder had not opened due to security concerns. The turnout was reported to be light due to Taliban threats. However, the violence was also a lot less than expected.

Results
On September 26, the Independent Election Commission (IEC) ordered recounts at locations in seven provinces, but left open the possibility of ordering recounts in other provinces. The recounts were ordered in Kunduz, Balkh, Takhar, Badakhshan and Parwan provinces in the north and northeast, Logar and Khost. At least five polling centres in eastern Khost province were declared invalid.

Preliminary results for all 34 provinces were originally due on October 8, but were unexpectedly put off citing the need to be "more accurate and precise." However, they would still be subject to confirmation after the Electoral Complaints Commission adjudicates on its legality. Final, certified results were released on October 31.

Elected MPs
(This list is incomplete)

Sources:

The MPs are made up of: (38.5%) 96 Pashtuns, (24.5%) 61 Hazaras, (21%) 53 Tajiks, (6%) 15 Uzbeks, (3%) 8 Aymāq, (3%) 8 Arab, (1%) 3 Turkmen, (1%) 2 Nuristanis, (1%) 1 Baloch, (0.5%) 1 Pashai and (0.5%) 1 Turkic.

Pre-result reaction
President Karzai responded to the allegations, saying "[i]t is early for us to make concrete judgment ... as far as the quality of the election is concerned, and organization, this is too early to judge. The president and government will make judgment after the relevant organisations have concluded their work."

Fraud allegations
Additionally, more than 100 complaints of fraud were filed in the first weekend, with another 1,300 complaints  submitted orally, though the election commission said that they would not be reviewed unless they were put into writing. By September 26, 3,460 complaints had been received by the Electoral Complaints Commission.

Many candidates demanded a suspension of the vote because of allegations of fraud and vote-rigging.

The election commission voided more than 20%, or 1.3 million, of the ballots, after fraud investigations.

Twenty-one elected parliamentarians were also disqualified due to fraud. A spokesman of the electoral commission said that 19 of the candidates were winning or leading their races, while two others had failed to win seats.

Despite ongoing allegations of fraud and disqualifications, Karzai agreed to open parliament if the said controversies were not brought up.

On 23 June 2011, a special tribunal led by Sidiquallah Haqiq and set up by Karzai to probe election irregularities declared the election of 62 MPs void and others elected in their stead, about a quarter of the races in the election. The MPs have the right to appeal to the Afghan Supreme Court

On August 21, 2011, The Afghanistan Independent Election Commission announced at a news conference that nine members of Parliament would be removed and that nine candidates, previously disqualified over electoral irregularities, would have their seats restored.

Party results
Only a minority of candidates contested the election on a party ticket, whilst a number of elected MP's were loosely associated with certain parties. Below is a table detailing the NDI's assessment of formal party strength. Due to the often unclear nature of Afghan party politics the figures given are not exact, and do not include unofficial party supporters, but are instead limited to the candidates who openly declared their party allegiance.

References

External links
 Official website of the Afghan Independent Election Commission
 Afghan2010.com - an election information website run by Democracy International

Elections in Afghanistan
Afghanistan
Parliamentary election
Afghanistan
National Assembly (Afghanistan)
Afghanistan
Election and referendum articles with incomplete results